Louis-Antoine Prat (born 24 December 1944 in Nice) is a French art historian and art collector, specialized in drawings.

Early life and education 
Louis-Antoine Prat is the son of Georges Prat, a wealthy French businessman. Georges was an art collector: he possessed paintings, sculptures, furniture and drawings.

Georges Prat died when Louis-Antoine Prat was six years old. He studied in both La Sorbonne and Sciences Po. He then followed the courses of the École du Louvre.

The collection 
Regularly exposed in France or other countries, the art collection of Louis-Antoine and Véronique Prat in their apartment of the 7th arrondissement of Paris has often been the subject  of publications.

Their collection is mainly directed towards French drawings from 1600 to 1900. The first drawing bought by Louis and Veronique was a portrait of Max Ernst by André Breton, coming from the collection of Valentine Hugo. They donated a lot of their collection to French museums under usufruct. He is the first private art collector to have been exposed while living in the Louvre museum.

Louis-Antoine Prat was elected president of the Société des amis du Louvre in 2016.

Selected works

Novels and short stories 
 Les points de repère, Albin Michel, 1965
 L'amateur d'absolu, La Table Ronde, 1983
 La ciguë avec toi, La Table Ronde, 1984
 Un requiem allemand, La Table Ronde, 1985
 Trois reflets d'Argentine, La Table Ronde, 1986
 Le tombeau du nouvelliste : nouvelles, La Table Ronde, 1988
Belle encore et autres nouvelles, Somogy, 2019

Radio drama
 La trahison, France Culture, 1969
 La leçon d’histoire, France Culture, 1969 (with D.-P. Larger)
 Parfois deux sans trois, France Culture, 1970
 Pourquoi Fleur pleurait-elle ?, France Culture, 1971
 Nuit de guerre au Louvre, Samsa, 2019

Art history
 Nicolas Poussin, 1594-1665, Catalogue raisonné des dessins, Milan, Leonardo, 1994, 2 volumes (with Pierre Rosenberg)
 Antoine Watteau, 1684-1721, Catalogue raisonné des dessins, Milan, Leonardo, 1996, 3 tomes (with P. Rosenberg)
 Dessins romantiques français provenant de collections privées parisiennes, Paris, Musée de la Vie Romantique, 2001
 Jacques-Louis David, 1748-1825, Catalogue raisonné des Dessins, Milan, Electa, 2002, 2 volumes (with Pierre Rosenberg)
 Théodore Chassériau. Obras sobre papel - Œuvres sur papier, Saint Domingue, 2004
 Ingres, Paris, Louvre, collection Cabinet des Dessins, n° 4, 2004
 Jacques-Louis David, Paris, Louvre, collection Cabinet des Dessins, n° 9, 2005 (with A. Serullaz)
 Ingres, Paris, Louvre, 2006
 La collection Chennevières. Quatre siècles de dessins français, Paris, 2007
 Le dessin français au XIXe siècle,  Paris, 2011
 Paul Delaroche, Le cabinet des Dessins, Editions Louvre-Le Passage, Paris, Louvre, 2012
 Le dessin français au XVIIe siècle, Paris
 Le dessin français au XVIIIe siècle, Paris
 Officier et gentleman au 19e siècle: la collection His de la Salle, Paris, 2019

References

1944 births
French art collectors
French art historians
People from Nice
Living people